Rokeby Stables was an American thoroughbred racehorse breeding farm in Upperville, Virginia, involved with both steeplechase and flat racing. The operation was established in the late 1940s by Paul Mellon (1907–1999) who won the Eclipse Award for Outstanding Breeder in 1971 and again in 1986. Under Mellon the stable had more than 1,000 stakes race winners with total earnings in excess of US$30 million.

Steeplechase racing
Rokeby Stables' American Way was the 1948 American Steeplechase Champion and in 1990 Molotov won the American Grand National Steeplechase.

Flat racing
Among its many successful horses, the stable owned the good runner Winter's Tale, Kentucky Derby winner, Sea Hero and the European champions, Mill Reef, Glint of Gold, and Gold and Ivory. Mill Reef's wins include The Derby and the Prix de l'Arc de Triomphe. Glint of Gold, a son of Mill Reef, won six European Group One races including the 1981 Derby Italiano, Grand Prix de Paris and Preis von Europa. Paul Mellon is one of only four men to have raced both a Kentucky Derby winner and an Epsom Derby winner. The others are John W. Galbreath, Michael Tabor and Prince Ahmed bin Salman. Mellon, however, is the only one to ever win the Kentucky Derby, Epsom Derby and the Prix de l'Arc de Triomphe.

In England, Mellon kept his horses at trainer Ian Balding's Park House Stables at Kingsclere and raced under his own name. In the United States, Rokeby Stables employed a number of prominent horse trainers including Hall of Fame inductee Elliott Burch who trained the stable's champions Arts and Letters, Quadrangle, Fort Marcy, Run the Gantlet, and Key to the Mint. Another Hall of Fame inductee, Mack Miller, took over as the Rokeby trainer in 1977. Miller's accomplishments include winning the Kentucky Derby with Sea Hero and the New York Handicap Triple in 1984 with Fit To Fight. Once Miller retired from training, in 1995, the then 88-year-old Paul Mellon decided to give up racing but still maintained his breeding operations.

References
Yale Alumni Magazine story on Paul Mellon titled Exit an Icon
 Paul Mellon/Rokeby Stables at the Virginia Sports Hall of Fame

American racehorse owners and breeders
Owners of Kentucky Derby winners
Fauquier County, Virginia
Horse farms in Virginia